Max Schellenberg (6 October 1927 – 26 May 2000) was a Swiss professional racing cyclist. He rode in five editions of the Tour de France.

References

External links
 

1927 births
2000 deaths
Swiss male cyclists
Cyclists from Zürich
Tour de Suisse stage winners